Nanxi is a town in Puning, Guangdong province, China. , it administers Nanxi Residential Neighborhood and the following 40 villages:
Nanxi Village
Yangmei Village
Xiaweiwang Village
Xiaweizhang Village
Dianguo Village
Dianzhan Village
Yihu Village
Yujiao Village
Dongyang Village
Chaowei Village
Jinjiao Village
Dengfeng Village
Laodou Village
Xindou Village
Xinxing Village
Linshangshu Village
Yuzhugang Village
Pingdingqiao Village
Sanfu Village
Yushantou Village
Pingxue Village
Pingsu Village
Zhongtang Village
Baoya Village
Xinfang Village
Laofang Village
Xinxi Village
Dalong Village
Shilin Village
Jiaxing Village
Landou Village
Dong First Village
Dong Second Village
Qianzhai Village
Houzhai Village
Shishang Village
Chenpan Village
Guopan Village
Beixi Village
Xinqiao Village

See also 
 List of township-level divisions of Guangdong

References 

Township-level divisions of Guangdong
Puning